William Franklin Cox was a college football player. From Cascade, Virginia, he played for the Virginia Polytechnic Institute as a tackle. Cox was captain of the 1899 team, and selected All-Southern in 1900.

References

All-Southern college football players
American football tackles
Virginia Tech Hokies football players
People from Pittsylvania County, Virginia